Ingo Appelt (born 20 April 1967, in Essen) is a German comedian.

Life 
His stepfather was German football player Günter Fürhoff. Appelt lived during his childhood in Würzburg. He works as a comedian on German television. Appelt worked in different German comedyshows, for example in 7 Tage, 7 Köpfe, Freitag Nacht News, in RTL Samstag Nacht or in Quatsch Comedy Club on television broadcaster ProSieben. Appelt is member of German party Social Democratic Party of Germany.
With his wife Sonia Appelt lives in Berlin.

Works

books 
 2008: Männer muss man schlagen (German)

singles 
 2000: Tanz für mich (with Aquagen)

albums 
 1997: Der Abräumer
 1998: Feuchte Seite
 2004: Schlicht Böse 
 2004: Superstar
 2008: Männer muss man schlagen
 2011: Frauen sind Göttinnen – Wir können nur noch beten

External links 
 Official Homepage by Ingo Appelt
 Appelt on WDR comedy portal

References 

German male comedians
People from Essen
1967 births
Living people
RTL Group people
ARD (broadcaster) people
Television people from North Rhine-Westphalia